The white-eyed vireo (Vireo griseus) is a small songbird of the family Vireonidae.

Distribution and habitat
It breeds in the eastern United States from New England west to northern Missouri and south to Texas and Florida, and also in eastern Mexico, northern Central America, Cuba and the Bahamas. Populations on the US Gulf Coast and further south are resident, but most North American birds migrate south in winter. This vireo frequents bushes and shrubs in abandoned cultivation or overgrown pastures.

Breeding
The grass-lined nest is a neat cup shape, attached to a fork in a tree branch by spider webs. It lays 3–5 dark-spotted white eggs. Both the male and female incubate the eggs for 12–16 days. The young leave the nest 9–11 days after hatching.

Description
Measurements:

 Length: 4.3-5.1 in (11-13 cm)
 Weight: 0.3-0.5 oz (10-14 g)
 Wingspan: 6.7 in (17 cm)

Its head and back are a greyish olive, and the underparts are white with yellow flanks. The wings and tail are dark, and there are two white wing bars on each wing. The eyes have white irises, and are surrounded by yellow spectacles. Sexes are similar.

Call
The white-eyed vireo's song is a variable and rapid six to seven note phrase, starting and ending with a sharp chick.

Diet
During the breeding season, the diet of this species consists almost exclusively of insects, primarily caterpillars. In the autumn and winter it supplements its diet of insects with berries.

Taxonomy
The white-eyed vireo was described by the French polymath Georges-Louis Leclerc, Comte de Buffon in 1780 in his Histoire naturelle des oiseaux. The bird was also illustrated in a hand-coloured plate engraved by François-Nicolas Martinet in the Planches Enluminées D'Histoire Naturelle which was produced under the supervision of Edme-Louis Daubenton to accompany Buffon's text.  Neither the plate caption nor Buffon's description included a scientific name but in 1783 the Dutch naturalist Pieter Boddaert coined the binomial name Tanagra grisea in his catalogue of the Planches Enluminées. Buffon specified that his specimen had come from Louisiana, but in 1945 the type locality was restricted to New Orleans. The white-eyed vireo is now placed in the genus Vireo was introduced in 1808 by the French ornithologist Louis Jean Pierre Vieillot. The word vireo was used by Latin authors for a small green migratory bird, probably a Eurasian golden oriole but a European greenfinch has also been suggested. The specific epithet griseus is Medieval Latin for grey.

Six subspecies are recognised:
 V. g. griseus (Boddaert, 1783) – central and east USA (includes noveboracensis)
 V. g. maynardi Brewster, 1887 – south Florida (southeast USA)
 V. g. bermudianus Bangs & Bradlee, 1901 – Bermuda
 V. g. micrus Nelson, 1899 – south Texas (south USA) and northeast Mexico
 V. g. perquisitor Nelson, 1900 – east Mexico
 V. g. marshalli Phillips, AR, 1991 – east central Mexico

The northern subspecies, V. g. noveboracensis, occupies most of the range of this species and is fully migratory. This sub-species is larger and has more brightly colored plumage than all other subspecies.

The resident southeastern coastal plain race, V. g. griseus is a slightly smaller and duller colored subspecies. It does not typically migrate out of its breeding range in the winter.

The resident Florida Keys race, V. g. maynardi, is greyer above and whiter below, and the south Texan V. g. micrus is like a smaller maynardi.

V. g. bermudianus is endemic to Bermuda, where it is known as the Chick of the Village. This has shorter wings and a duller plumage. Along with other endemic and native Bermudian birds, it was threatened with extinction following the loss of 8 million Bermuda cedar trees in the 1940s, and is now quite rare. This species is listed under the Bermuda Protected Species Act 2003.

Gallery

References

External links

Xeno-canto: audio recordings of the white-eyed vireo
Bermuda Online: Bermudian Fauna
Nature Conservation in Bermuda at Cave Biology.Com
White-eyed Vireo Species Account - Cornell Lab of Ornithology
 Bird Banding at Caddo Lake (includes White-eyed Vireo photo)
 White-eyed Vireo Bird Sound at Florida Museum of Natural History
 
 
 

white-eyed vireo
Native birds of the Eastern United States
Native birds of the Southeastern United States
Birds of the Rio Grande valleys
Birds of Mexico
white-eyed vireo
white-eyed vireo
Extant Late Pleistocene first appearances